Eugene Augustus Prince (July 31, 1930 – October 13, 2007) was an American politician in the state of Washington. He served in the Washington House of Representatives from 1981 to 1993 for district 9, and in the Senate from 1993 to 1999. He was also a wheat farmer and an alumnus of Washington State University.

References

1930 births
2007 deaths
Republican Party members of the Washington House of Representatives
20th-century American politicians
Republican Party Washington (state) state senators